Blumenau Futsal, is a Brazilian futsal club from Blumenau founded in 2017 which plays in Liga Futsal. The club was founded when Blumenau based AD Hering disbanded its futsal team after the 2015 Liga Futsal season, opening a franchise position which was bought by the new club.

Club honours

State competitions
 Copa Santa Catarina: 2017

Current squad

References

External links
 Blumenau Futsal official website
 Blumenau Futsal LNF profile
 Blumenau Futsal in zerozero.pt

Futsal clubs established in 2017
2017 establishments in Brazil
Futsal clubs in Brazil
Sports teams in Santa Catarina (state)